Davis Kasey Tutt (1836 – July 21, 1865) was an American Old West gambler and former soldier, best remembered for being killed during the Wild Bill Hickok – Davis Tutt shootout of 1865, which launched Wild Bill Hickok to fame as a gunfighter.

Tutt was born in Yellville, Arkansas, son of Hansford Tutt, a member of a politically influential family in Marion County, Arkansas, and his first wife. When he was a boy, Tutt's family became involved in the Tutt-Everett War, during which his father and other family members were killed.

Enlisting in 1862 in Company A, 27th Arkansas Infantry Regiment, Davis Tutt fought for the Confederate States of America in the Trans-Mississippi Theater during the American Civil War. At its end, he decided to go west, stopping first in Springfield, Missouri, where he met Wild Bill Hickok. Despite serving on opposite sides during the war, they became friends and often gambled together. Tutt even loaned Hickok money on occasion. Historians have debated the amount, but Hickok himself stated he owed Tutt $25. The fall out between Tutt and Hickok was due to Hickok's failure to repay the money he owed, worsened by Tutt taking Hickok's watch as collateral. Hickok allowed Tutt to take it, but warned him to never wear it in public. 

Hickok approached the square and called out Tutt. Tutt responded and the two men faced each other fearlessly. Each fired one shot. Tutt missed, but Hickok's shot killed Tutt.

References

External links

American gamblers
People from Marion County, Arkansas
1836 births
1865 deaths
Deaths by firearm in Missouri
People of the American Old West
People of Arkansas in the American Civil War
Confederate States Army personnel
American duellists